Red Willow or Redwillow may refer to:

Trees
Cornus amomum
Cornus sericea
Salix laevigata

Other uses
Red Willow, Alberta
Red Willow County, Nebraska
Red Willow Creek
Redwillow River
Red Willow Vineyard